The Jacob Ruppert Sr. House was a large mansion located on 1115 Fifth Avenue (now 1119 Fifth Avenue) on the southeast corner of East 93rd Street and Fifth Avenue, in the Upper East Side of Manhattan, New York City.

History 
It was originally constructed for the brewer Jacob Ruppert Sr. (1842–1915), the father of Jacob Ruppert. His parents originally came from Bavaria. The building was designed by William Schickel.

The house featured a small German Bierstube, or taproom, which still exists. The structure itself was sold by the heirs and torn down in 1925.

References

Fifth Avenue
Houses in Manhattan
Upper East Side
Demolished buildings and structures in Manhattan
Buildings and structures demolished in 1925